Per Anders Gunnar Kompass (born 25 August 1955) is a Swedish diplomat and former UN official. He worked as the field operations director at the Office of the United Nations High Commissioner for Human Rights (OHCHR) between 2009 and 2016.

Kompass acted as a whistleblower when he advised French authorities about a report on child sexual abuse carried out by French Peacekeepers in the Central African Republic between December 2013 and July 2014. The French authorities rapidly took action to investigate the allegations in the report. The investigations of fourteen soldiers are still ongoing. However, the OHCHR chief, Prince Zeid bin Ra'ad, found that Anders Kompass had breached the OHCHR rules of conduct by not seeking the approval of his superior prior to passing on the report to the French. Prince Zeid also stated that the report included names and addresses of victims of the abuse, thereby putting them at risk for stigma and retaliation in their home communities. Therefore, he suspended Kompass from his position. However, the suspension was found to be unlawful by the United Nations Dispute Tribunal on 6 May 2015. Prince Zeid then proposed to dismantle the field operations unit of the OHCHR, which effectively would have removed Kompass' position from the organization. Meanwhile, the United States and other member states criticized the UN leadership for seeming to spend more efforts on discrediting Kompass for disclosing the sexual abuses rather than on holding the abusers themselves accountable for their crimes.

On 22 June 2015, after much criticism in the media, the UN Secretary-General Ban Ki-moon appointed an independent panel to investigate the matter. The UN panel cleared Anders Kompass from any wrongdoing and concluded that he did indeed have the authority to share the information in the report with the French authorities. The panel also found that the concerns of risks to the victims by including their identities in the report had been largely exaggerated.

On 8 June 2016, Kompass announced his resignation from the United Nations, citing "the complete impunity for those who have been found to have, in various degrees, abused their authority, together with the unwillingness of the hierarchy to express any regrets for the way they acted towards me".

On 12 October 2017, Kompass was appointed Swedish Ambassador to Guatemala.

References

1955 births
Living people
People from Karlskoga Municipality
Swedish officials of the United Nations
Swedish whistleblowers
Swedish diplomats
Ambassadors of Sweden to Guatemala